Black Point is a community in Pictou County, Nova Scotia, Canada. In 2019, two residents donated the Boston Christmas Tree.

References

Communities in Pictou County